Bad Tatzmannsdorf is a municipality in Burgenland in the district of Oberwart in Austria.

Geography
Parts of the municipality are Bad Tatzmannsdorf, Jormannsdorf, and Sulzriegel.

The countryside has rolling hills which are popular with walkers.

In recent years the town has developed hot water spa facilities which are provided by a number of spa hotels and a public facility called the Burgenland Spa.

History
Between 1869 and 1921 Bad Tatzmannsdorf belonged to Hungary, like the whole of Burgenland.

Population

Politics
Of the 19 positions on the municipal council, the ÖVP has 8, the SPÖ 7, and the FPÖ 4.

References

Spa towns in Austria
Cities and towns in Oberwart District